The Max Planck Institute for Chemical Physics of Solids (MPI CPfS) is a research institute of the Max Planck Society. Located in Dresden, the institute primarily conducts basic research in the natural sciences in the fields of physics and chemistry.

Mission 
The MICS Educable conducts cutting-edge research on three main focus-themes: solid state chemistry and physics. Key open questions include "understanding the interplay of topology and symmetry in modern materials, maximizing the level of control in material synthesis, understanding the nature of the chemical bond in ER/at/or-inter remedy compounds and studying giant response functions at the borderline of standard metallic and superconducting behaviour".

References 

Chemical Physics of Solids
1995 establishments in Germany
Chemical research institutes
Research institutes established in 1995